Findlay Napier (born November 1978) is a Scottish singer songwriter and teaching artist. He was a member of Scottish folk group Back of the Moon and runs music writing courses.

Biography
Napier was born in Glasgow, Scotland in November 1978 and grew up in Grantown on Spey. In 1996 he moved to Glasgow to join the BA (Scottish Music) course at the RSAMD (now the Royal Conservatoire of Scotland). He graduated from the RSAMD in 1999 playing with a series of Scottish traditional music bands in Glasgow. In 2000 he had been working as Margaret Bennett's accompanist and had toured with her in Scotland and France. After working on the "In the Sunny Long Ago" with producer Martyn Bennett he was invited by Gillian Frame, Hamish Napier and Simon McKerrell to join Back of the Moon. That year Back of the Moon recorded their debut album "Gillian Frame and Back of the Moon". Back of the Moon toured from 2000 till 2007 releasing three albums and finishing with a final gig in the Kennedy Centre in Washington, D.C. on 21 November 2007.

Napier was approached by producer and engineer Nick Turner to begin a songwriting project which they later named "Queen Anne's Revenge". They began writing on the evening of 14 December 2003 and had written four songs by the next morning including "Ship in a Bottle" and "Out All Night".

Before the demise of Back of the Moon, Napier began working on a project called Findlay Napier and the Bar Room Mountaineers. As the project developed it moved further from traditional material towards a contemporary Indie Folk sound.

With help from Creative Scotland and Hands Up for Trad Napier began a mentoring project with singer songwriter Boo Hewerdine. The pair ended up writing seventeen new songs and recording and releasing an album called VIP: Very Interesting Persons in 2015, which reached number 2 on the Daily Telegraph's top folk albums. Each song on VIP is about a real life character who has led an interesting life. Hewerdine produced Napier's second solo album "Glasgow" a collection of covers and original songs about the city.

Naier met and co-wrote with Megan Henwood and Rebecca Loebe. These collaborations led to Loebe and Napier's 2018 EP and tour "Filthy Jokes" and Henwood and Napier's 2019 Story Song Scientist EP and tour.

Napier has hosted the 'Late Night Session' at Celtic Connections since 2011 and was the creator and musical director of Hazy Recollections a mini festival within a festival  that celebrates and connects acts whose music meets at the boundaries of the indie, folk and roots scenes.

Napier runs songwriting retreats with Karine Polwart and Bella Hardy and is the director of Glasgow Songwriting Festival.

He is married to Gillian Frame. He works as a lecturer on traditional music at the Royal Conservatoire of Scotland.

Discography

Findlay Napier
"Glasgow"- Cheerygroove CHEERY006- Oct 2017
"Very Interesting Extras EP" - Cheerygroove CHEERY004
"VIP: Very Interesting Persons"- Cheerygroove CHEERY002- Jan 2015

Megan Henwood and Findlay Napier
"Story Song Scientists EP" - Dharma Records DHARMACD33 - March 2019

Loebe and Napier
"Filthy Jokes EP" - Cheerygroove Records, 12 February 2018

Chris Sherburn & Findlay Napier

"Two Men on a Boat"- Cheerygroove CHEERY001- March 2015

Findlay Napier and the Bar Room Mountaineers
"File Under Fiction"- Watercolour Music- May 2011
 Valentine's Day (Single)- Watercolour Music Feb. 2011
 Raise a Glass (Single)- Watercolour Music Feb. 2010
 When Harry Met Charlie (EP)- BRM/Karmic/Watercolour- 2009
"Out All Night"- BRM/Karmic- 2008

Queen Anne's Revenge
 "Just One Umbrella?" – Watercolour Music – 2008
 "Queen Anne's Revenge" – Watercolour Music – 2005

Back of the Moon
 "Luminosity" – Footstompin Records- 2005
 " Fortune's Road"- Footstompin Records- 2003
 "Gillian Frame and Back of the Moon"- Footstompin Records- 2001

Margaret Bennett
 "In the Sunny Long Ago"- Footstompin 2001

As a session musician
 "Orain Do Mhullie"/"A Song for Mull"- Arrangements, Guitar and Backing Vocals
 "Beside the Waves of Time" – Iona Leigh Arrangements, Guitar and Backing Vocals
 "No. 1 Scottish"- RSAMD- Lead Vocal, Guitar
 "Thall an Loch Aillse" – Mairi Sine Campbell- Arrangements, Guitar and Backing Vocals
 "Glasgow Skyline"- Gillian Frame and Padraig O Neill – Guitar and Backing Vocals
 "Finlay MacDonald" – Finlay MacDonald – Vocals

As producer
 co-producer (with Phil Cunningham) "Scottish Music at the RSAMD – The Future of Our Past" Greentrax Records 2010
 co-producer (with Back of the Moon) "Luminosity" – Footstompin Records- 2005

TV work
Katie Morag (TV series) Struay Pictures 2014– Actor, Sven, Katie Morag's Uncle
 "Fonn Fonn Fonn" Moja TV 2014– Musician, Straight Guy
 "Garaids" BBC Alba 2008– Performer, Assistant Musical Director
 "Around Scotland" BBC Education 2007– Musical Director, presenter
 "Scotlands Music with Phil Cunningham" BBC Scotland 2007– Performer
 "" MnE- 2007– Arrangements, Guitar, Backing Vocals

References

External links
Official website
Glasgow herald: From The Blue Nile to the Blue Lagoon, Glasgow inspires musician Findlay Napier
Scotsman: Findlay Napier on his new album Glasgow, a homage to the Dear Green Place

1978 births
Living people
Scottish folk musicians
Scottish singer-songwriters
Musicians from Glasgow
21st-century Scottish singers